The 1967 College Football All-America team is composed of college football players who were selected as All-Americans by various organizations that chose College Football All-America Teams in 1967.

The NCAA recognizes six selectors as "official" for the 1967 season.  They are (1) the American Football Coaches Association (AFCA), (2) the Associated Press (AP), (3) the Central Press Association (CP), (4) the Football Writers Association of America (FWAA), (5) the Newspaper Enterprise Association (NEA), and (6) the United Press International (UPI). Four of the six teams (AP, UPI, NEA, and FWAA) were selected by polling of sports writers and/or broadcasters. The Central Press team was selected with input from the captains of the major college teams.  The AFCA team was based on a poll of coaches.  Other notable selectors, though not recognized by the NCAA as official, included Time magazine, The Sporting News (TSN), and the Walter Camp Football Foundation (WCFF).

Consensus All-Americans
The NCAA recognizes 22 players as "consensus" All-Americans for the 1967 season. The following chart identifies the consensus All-Americans and displays which first-team designations they received.

Offensive selections

Ends 

 Dennis Homan, Alabama (AFCA [split end], AP-1, CP-1, FWAA, NEA-2 [FL], UPI-1, FN, WCFF, TSN)
 Ron Sellers,  Florida State (AFCA [flanker], AP-1, NEA-1 [split end], UPI-2, FN)
 Jim Seymour, Notre Dame  (CP-1, UPI-1, FN, WCFF)
 Ted Kwalick, Penn State (AFCA, NEA-1 [tight end], UPI-2)
 Ken Hebert, Houston (FWAA, NEA-2 [split end])
 Haven Moses, San Diego State (TSN)
 Fred Hyatt, Auburn (FN)
 Gary Steele, Army (NEA-2 [tight end])
 Jim Beirne, Purdue (CP-2)
 Dick Trapp, Florida (CP-2)
 Rob Taylor, Navy (CP-3)
 Phil Odle, Brigham Young (CP-3)

Offensive tackles 

 Ron Yary, USC (AFCA, AP-1, CP-1, FWAA, NEA-1, UPI-1, FN, WCFF, Time, TSN)
 Edgar Chandler, Georgia (AFCA, AP-1, CP-3, FWAA, NEA-1, UPI-1, FN, WCFF, Time, TSN)
 Larry Slagle, UCLA (CP-1)
 John Williams, Minnesota (Time)
 Russ Washington, Missouri (NEA-2)
 John Boynton, Tennessee (CP-2, NEA-2)
 Mo Moorman, Texas A&M (UPI-2)
 Bill Stanfill, Georgia (UPI-2)
 Mike Motler, Colorado (CP-2)
 Glenn Greenberg, Yale (CP-3)

Offensive guards 

 Harry Olszewski, Clemson  (AFCA, FWAA, NEA-2, UPI-1, WCFF)
 Rich Stotter, Houston (AFCA, AP-1, CP-1, NEA-1, UPI-1, FN)
 Gary Cassells, Indiana  (AP-1, FWAA, UPI-2, WCFF)
 Phil Tucker, Texas Tech (NEA-1)
 Bob Kalsu, Oklahoma (CP-1)
 Willie Banks, Alcorn A&M (NEA-2)
 Barry Wilson, LSU (NEA-2)
 Bruce Gunstra, Northwestern (CP-2)
 Dick Swatland, Notre Dame (CP-2)
 Tony Conti, Michigan State (CP-3)
 Ray Phillips, Michigan (CP-3, UPI-2)

Centers 

 Bob Johnson, Tennessee (College Football Hall of Fame) (AFCA, AP-1, CP-1, FWAA, NEA-1, UPI-1, FN, WCFF, Time, TSN)
 John Didion, Oregon State (UPI-2)
 Jon Kolb, Oklahoma State (CP-2)
 Joe Dayton, Michigan (CP-3)

Quarterbacks 

 Gary Beban, UCLA (College Football Hall of Fame) (AFCA, AP-1, CP-1, FWAA, NEA-1, UPI-1, FN, WCFF, Time, TSN)
 Ken Stabler, Alabama (CP-2, NEA-2, FN)
 Mike Phipps, Purdue (FN)
 Kim Hammond, Florida State (UPI-2)
 Paul Toscano, Wyoming (CP-3)

Running backs 

 O. J. Simpson, USC (College and Pro Football Halls of Fame) (AFCA, AP-1, CP-1 [halfback], FWAA, NEA, UPI-1 [halfback], FN, WCFF, Time, TSN)
 Leroy Keyes, Purdue (College Football of Fame) (AFCA, AP-1, CP-1 [halfback], FWAA, NEA-1 [FL], UPI-1 [halfback], FN, WCFF, Time, TSN)
 Larry Csonka, Syracuse (College and Pro Football Halls of Fame) (AFCA [fullback], AP-1 [fullback], CP-1 [fullback], FWAA, NEA-1, UPI-1 [fullback], FN [fullback], WCFF, TSN)
 Lee White,  Weber State (FN [fullback], Time)
 Chris Gilbert, Texas (College Football Hall of Fame) (CP-2, NEA-2, UPI-2 [halfback], FN)
 Richmond Flowers, Tennessee (FN)
 Jerry LeVias, SMU (FN)
 Ron Johnson, Michigan (College Football Hall of Fame) (CP-2)
 Butch Colson, East Carolina (CP-2)
 Larry Smith, Florida (NEA-2, CP-3)
 Warren McVea, Houston (UPI-2 [halfback], FN)
 Bill Enyart, Oregon State (UPI-2 [fullback])
 Vic Gatto, Harvard (CP-3)
 Perry Williams, Purdue (CP-3)

Defensive selections

Defensive ends 

 Ted Hendricks, Miami (AFCA, AP-1, CP-1, FWAA, NEA-1, UPI-1, FN [end], WCFF)
 Tim Rossovich, USC (AFCA, CP-1, FWAA, NEA-2, UPI-1, FN)
 Bob Stein, Minnesota  (FWAA, NEA-1, UPI-2, WCFF)
 Claude Humphrey, Tennessee State  (Time, TSN)
 John Garlington, LSU (AFCA, UPI-2)
 Bill Dow, Navy (CP-2)
 George Foussekis, VPI (CP-3) 
 Bob Stein, Minnesota (CP-3)

Defensive tackles 

 Dennis Byrd, North Carolina State  (AFCA, AP-1, CP-1, FWAA, NEA-2, UPI-1, WCFF, Time, TSN)
 Kevin Hardy, Notre Dame  (AP-1 [defensive end], CP-2 [defensive end], NEA-2 [defensive end], UPI-1, FN, WCFF, Time, TSN)
 Bill Staley, Utah State (CP-1, NEA-2, UPI-2, FN, Time, TSN)
 Mike Dirks, Wyoming (FWAA, NEA-1)
 Jess Lewis, Oregon State (NEA-1)
 Russ Washington, Missouri (TSN)
 Jon Sandstrom, Oregon State (AFCA)
 Jim Urbanek, Mississippi (CP-2, UPI-2, FN)
 Doug Crusan, Indiana (CP-2)
 Dick Himes, Ohio State (CP-3)
 Ray Norton, Boston Univ. (CP-3)

Middle guards 

 Granville Liggins, Oklahoma (AFCA [guard], AP-1, CP-1 [guard], FWAA, NEA-1, UPI-1, FN, WCFF)
 Wayne Meylan, Nebraska (AFCA [linebacker], AP [linebacker], CP-1 [guard], FWAA, NEA-2 [middle guard], UPI-2 [middle guard], FN, WCFF, Time, TSN)
 Curley Culp,  Arizona State (CP-2 [guard], FN, Time, TSN)
 Greg Pipes, Baylor (AFCA [guard], AP-1 [defensive tackle])
 George Dames, Oregon (CP-2 [guard])
 Bob Foyle, Duke (CP-3 [guard])
 Carl Garber, Missouri (CP-3 [guard])

Linebackers 

 Adrian Young, USC (AFCA, AP-1, CP-1, FWAA, NEA-2, UPI-1, WCFF, TSN)
 Don Manning, UCLA  (CP-1, NEA-1, UPI-1, FN, WCFF)
 Fred Carr, UTEP (NEA-1, Time, TSN)
 Corby Robertson, Texas (FWAA, NEA-2)
 Bill Hobbs, Texas A&M (AP-1)
 D.D. Lewis, Mississippi State (NEA-1, UPI-2)
 Tom Beutler, Toledo (CP-1)
 Mike McGill, Notre Dame (Time)
 John Pergine, Notre Dame (CP-3, UPI-2)
 Don Chiafaro, Harvard (CP-2)
 Fred Carr, UTEP (CP-2)
 Danny Lankas, Kansas State (CP-2)
 Tony Kyasky, Syracuse (CP-3)
 Ken Kaczmarek, Indiana (CP-3)

Defensive backs 

 Tom Schoen, Notre Dame (AFCA, AP-1, CP-1, FWAA, UPI-1, FN, WCFF, Time, TSN)
 Frank Loria, Virginia Tech (AFCA, AP-1, FWAA, NEA-1 [safety], UPI-1, WCFF)
 Dick Anderson, Colorado (AP-1, NEA-1, UPI-2)
 Bobby Johns, Alabama (AFCA, CP-2, UPI-1, FN, WCFF)
 Jim Smith, Oregon (CP-3, NEA-1, UPI-2, Time, TSN)
 Major Hazelton,  Florida A. & M. (Time, TSN)
 Charlie West, UTEP (NEA-2, Time, TSN)
 Harry Cheatwood, Oklahoma State (CP-1)
 Fred Combs, North Carolina State (FWAA, UPI-2)
 Al Dorsey, Tennessee (UPI-1, FN)
 Mike Battle, USC (CP-3, UPI-2)
 Neal Starkey, Air Force (CP-2)

Special teams

Kicker 

 Jerry DePoyster, Wyoming (AP-1, FN, TSN)

Punter 

 Zenon Andrusyshyn, UCLA (TSN)

Key 
 Bold – Consensus All-American
 -1 – First-team selection
 -2 – Second-team selection
 -3 – Third-team selection

Official selectors
 AFCA = American Football Coaches Association, separate offensive units based on votes from nearly 700 coaches
 AP = Associated Press, "selected on the basis of recommendations from the Top Ten AP football boards in each of the eight [NCAA] districts"
 CP = Central Press Association, first-, second- and third-teams selected "with the aid of the major college football captains, who were polled by ballot"
 FWAA = Football Writers Association of America
 NEA = Newspaper Enterprise Association
 UPI = United Press International, first- and second-team squads "chosen by direct vote of 207 sportswriters and broadcasters throughout the nation, the only honor squad so chosen"

Unofficial selectors
 FN = The Football News, consisting of the 34 best college football players as selected by the correspondents and staff of The Football News
 Time = Time magazine
 TSN = The Sporting News
 WC = Walter Camp Football Foundation

See also
 1967 All-Atlantic Coast Conference football team
 1967 All-Big Eight Conference football team
 1967 All-Big Ten Conference football team
 1967 All-Pacific-8 Conference football team
 1967 All-SEC football team
 1967 All-Southwest Conference football team

References

All-America Team
College Football All-America Teams